Anestia ombrophanes, the clouded footman, is a moth of the subfamily Arctiinae. The species was first described by Edward Meyrick in 1886. It is known from the Australian Capital Territory, New South Wales, Queensland, Western Australia, Victoria and South Australia. 

The wingspan is about 20 mm. Adult males have black and white forewings and plain pale yellow hindwings. Females are wingless.

The larvae feed on lichens. They are grey and black, with orange spots on the sides and yellow speckles on the back and underside. There are two pale yellow lines running along the back. Pupation takes place in a sparse cocoon made of silk and larval hairs which is attached to a tree or wall.

References

Lithosiini
Moths described in 1886
Moths of Australia